Oru Mutham Manimutham is a 1997 Indian Malayalam-language film, directed by Sajan and produced by George Karyathu and Mahima Ramachandran. The film stars Mukesh, Vaishnavi MacDonald, Srividya, KPAC Lalitha and Harishree Ashokan in the lead roles. The film has musical score by Raveendran Master.

Cast
Mukesh as Balachandran
Vaishnavi MacDonald as Lekha Menon
Srividya as Lakshmi
KPAC Lalitha
Harishree Ashokan as Kumaran
Janardanan as Sreedharan
Lalu Alex as Fenadez
N. F. Varghese as Krishna Menon
Prathapachandran
Ramadevi as Sarada
Thesni Khan as Ammutti
Valsala Menon

Soundtrack
The music was composed by Raveendran with lyrics by O. N. V. Kurup.

References

External links
 

1997 films
1990s Malayalam-language films